Bucculatrix transversata is a moth in the family Bucculatricidae. It is found in North America, where it has been recorded from California. The species was first described in 1910 by Annette Frances Braun.

The wingspan is about 7 mm. The forewings are bright brown, except along the wing margins where the scales are white with black tips. The hindwings are grey. Adults have been recorded on wing in July.

The larvae feed on Ambrosia psilostachya. They feed on the upper side of the leaf, consuming irregular patches of leaf tissue. The larvae can be found in October. Pupation takes place at the end of October.

References

Natural History Museum Lepidoptera generic names catalog

Bucculatricidae
Moths described in 1910
Moths of North America
Taxa named by Annette Frances Braun